Zoran Stojković (7 October 1946 — 6 July 2020) was a Serbian politician who served as Minister of Justice in the Government of Serbia from 2004 to 2007.

Stojković graduated from the University of Belgrade's Law School and initially worked as district court judge. In the late 1980s he began a private law practice. In 1984, as a Yugoslav communist-era judge, Stojković convicted six dissidents in a trial dubbed by Amnesty International as the "last Stalinist trial in Europe". Stojković is one of the people who founded the Democratic Party of Serbia, and the Serbian election committee employed him for several elections. He was married and had two children.

References

1946 births
2020 deaths
Politicians from Belgrade
Democratic Party of Serbia politicians
University of Belgrade Faculty of Law alumni
Government ministers of Serbia
Justice ministers of Serbia